The 2019–20 Djibouti Premier League was the 32nd season of the Djibouti Premier League, the top-tier football league in Djibouti. The season began on 27 December 2019 and ended on 5 September 2020. The 20,000-capacity El Hadj Hassan Gouled Aptidon Stadium is the main venue of the league.

Standings

References

Football leagues in Djibouti
Premier League
Premier League
Djibouti
Djibouti Premier League, 2019-20